Wheelchair basketball at the 1992 Summer Paralympics consisted of men's and women's team events.

Medal summary 

Source: Paralympic.org

Medal table

See also
Basketball at the 1992 Summer Olympics

References 

 

 
Wheelchair
1992
1992–93 in Spanish basketball
International basketball competitions hosted by Spain
International basketball competitions hosted by Catalonia